The Barbarian and the Troll is an American puppet comedy television series created by Mike Mitchell and Drew Massey that aired on Nickelodeon from April 2 to June 25, 2021.

Premise 
In the land of Gothmoria, Brendar is a fierce warrior princess on a quest to avenge an attack on her family. She finds adventure when she meets Evan, a spirited bridge troll in search of excitement and a place to perform his songs. They team up to save their kingdom and make both their dreams come true. Brendar and Evan are soon joined in their quest by Horus the wizard, his daughter Stacey who has been turned into an owl, and Horus' enchanted Axe.

Cast 
 Spencer Grammer as the voice of Brendar, a barbarian warrior on a quest to slay the demon that killed her mother and spirited away her younger brother.
 Drew Massey as Evan, a troll prince who joins Brendar's questing party to follow his dream and become a bard.

Other credited cast include Colleen Smith, Allan Trautman, Sarah Sarang Oh, Peggy Etra, James Murray, Nicolette Santino, Jeny Cassady, and Gina Yashere.

Production 
The series, then titled Brendar the Barbarian, was officially announced on September 23, 2020, with production set to begin in late 2020. It was filmed in Vancouver, British Columbia, Canada. Spencer Grammer was cast as the voice of Brendar with the puppeteers consisting of Drew Massey, Colleen Smith, Allan Trautman, Sarah Sarang Oh, Nicolette Santino, Peggy Etra, James Murray, and Jeny Cassidy. Phil LaMarr and Gina Yashere have been confirmed to provide voices with the former being cast as the voice of a knight named Steve.

Episodes

Reception

Ratings 
 
}}

Awards and nominations

References

External links 
 
 

2020s American children's comedy television series
2020s Nickelodeon original programming
2021 American television series debuts
2021 American television series endings
American television shows featuring puppetry
English-language television shows
Television shows filmed in Vancouver
Trolls in popular culture